The American Chiropractic Board of Sports Physicians, founded in 1980, is a chiropractic agency that certifies chiropractors practicing in the field of sports medicine as who have completed a certification program (Certified  Chiropractic Sports Physician) or a post-doctoral degree program (Diplomate of  the American Chiropractic Board of Sports Physicians).

Credentialling of the Board
On October 31, 2006, the National Commission for Certifying Agencies (NCCA) granted accreditation to the American Chiropractic Board of Sports Physicians for demonstrating compliance with the NCCA Standards for the Accreditation of Certification Programs. NCCA is the accrediting body of the National Organization for Competency Assurance (NOCA). The NCCA Standards were created in 1977 and updated in 2003 to ensure certification programs adhere to modern standards of practice for the certification industry. The ACBSP joins an elite group of 78 organizations with 190 programs that have received and maintained NCCA accreditation.

Boards given

CCSP
The Certified  Chiropractic Sports Physician  or CCSP, certification, is a one post graduate year  course, taken at centers around the country, in week-end programs, and consists of 12 week-end  classes and a Board exam. This course was first given in New Jersey, by National College of Chiropractic  in 1980, and was then called  Certified  Team Physician, or CTP. The  name was later changed to Certified Chiropractic Team Physician, or CCTP, and finally to its present designation of Certified Chiropractic Sports Physician

DACBSP
The Diplomate level course requires 3 years of such classes  and a more comprehensive exam.  recipients receive the DACBSP  degree, Diplomate of the American Chiropractic  Board of Sports  Physicians.

References

External links
 ACBSP's Website

Sports chiropractic
Chiropractic organizations